The following is a list of the urban local bodies in the Indian state of Uttarakhand.

List of municipal corporations in Uttarakhand

List of municipal councils in Uttarakhand

List of nagar panchayats in Uttarakhand

List of cantonment boards in Uttarakhand

District-wise summary

Elections

Elections to the urban local bodies in Uttarakhand are held once in five years, are conducted by Uttarakhand State Election Commission. Both direct and indirect elections apply for the urban local bodies.

See also
Local government in India
Municipal governance in India
Municipal elections in India
List of municipal corporations in India
List of cities in Uttarakhand by population
List of cities in India by population

References

External links 

Uttarakhand Urban Development Directorate (PDF)

Local government in Uttarakhand
Local government-related lists
Uttarakhand-related lists